The Family Justice Council, established in 2004, is an advisory, non-statutory, non-departmental public body sponsored by the Judicial Office of England and Wales. It provides independent expert advice, from an inter-disciplinary perspective, on the operation and reform of the family justice system to the Family Justice Board (jointly chaired by ministers from the Ministry of Justice and Department for Education) and Government.  It is chaired by the President of the Family Division, and in August 2012 became part of the President's office.

References

External links 
 Family Justice Council website
  Judiciary of England and Wales website

Family law in the United Kingdom
2004 establishments in the United Kingdom
Organizations established in 2004